Battle Mountain Airport , also known as Lander County Airport, is 3 miles (5 km) southeast of Battle Mountain, Nevada, United States. This general aviation airport is owned by Lander County and operated by the Battle Mountain Airport Authority.

History
The airport was built by the United States Army Air Forces about 1942, and was known as Battle Mountain Flight Strip.  It was an emergency landing airfield by the Reno Army Air Base for military aircraft on training flights.  It was also designated as a CAA Intermediate Field for civil aircraft emergency use.  It was closed after World War II, and was turned over for local government use by the War Assets Administration (WAA).

Facilities

 3/21: 7,299 x 150 ft (2,225 x 46 m), surface: asphalt
 12/30: 7,300 x 100 ft (2,225 x 30 m), surface: asphalt
 Helipad H1: 60 x 60 ft (18 x 18 m), surface: concrete
 Helipad H2: 60 x 60 ft (18 x 18 m), surface: concrete

Organizations

BAM is home to the Battle Mountain Air Attack Base, which is run by the Bureau of Land Management. The Air Attack Base provides air tanker support for fire suppression in northern Nevada.  The Nevada Division of Forestry also operates an air tanker base at BAM.

Displays
Several aerospace exhibits are available at the airport.

Popular culture
The airstrip at Battle Mountain was used as a setting by novelist Dale Brown in his techno-thriller novel Battle Born.

References

Other sources
 
 Shaw, Frederick J. (2004), Locating Air Force Base Sites History's Legacy, Air Force History and Museums Program, United States Air Force, Washington DC, 2004.
 Brown, Dale (1999) Battle Born, 416 pp.(hardcover). Bantam Books, New York, NY, 1999.

External links
  from Nevada DOT
 
 

Airports in Nevada
Buildings and structures in Lander County, Nevada
Flight Strips of the United States Army Air Forces
Airfields of the United States Army Air Forces in Nevada
World War II airfields in the United States
Transportation in Lander County, Nevada
Airports established in 1942
1942 establishments in Nevada